Longitude LLC is the inventor and distributor of the Longitude Enhanced Pari-Mutuel System™, a pool betting technology platform.

Pari-Mutuel Wagering 
The Longitude Enhanced Pari-Mutuel System enables sports betting and race track operators to offer a wider range of bet types, a richer display of odds data, and bigger pools with more stable odds. By allowing a range of different types of wagers on an individual race or sporting event to be aggregated into merged pools, the Longitude Enhanced Pari-Mutuel System makes more efficient use of existing liquidity. Current customers utilizing the Longitude Enhanced Pari-Mutuel System include The Hong Kong Jockey Club, Tabcorp and The Football Pools.

Financial Markets 
The globally patented Longitude Enhanced Pari-Mutuel System has its roots in the financial markets, where it has been used for the pricing and settlement of markets on a range of financial and naturally occurring events, such as credit, economic statistics, and weather. Longitude LLC, a wholly owned subsidiaries of Nasdaq, is currently based in New York to further explore a number of financial markets applications.

History 
Longitude was founded in New York in 1999.

In 2006, ISE and Goldman Sachs jointly acquired all of the Longitude assets to conduct auctions on economic data options in partnership with the Chicago Mercantile Exchange (CME) and energy storage statistics in partnership with the New York Mercantile Exchange.

In 2007, ISE purchased Goldman’s entire stake and Longitude became a wholly owned subsidiary of ISE.

In 2010 and 2011, the Longitude platform was reengineered to serve as a backend calculation engine for the sports betting and horse race wagering industries.

In 2012, Sportech and Longitude sign a partnership to add depth to betting products.

In 2013, The Hong Kong Jockey Club announces signing of strategic technology services agreement with Longitude.

In 2014, Longitude Expands Relationship with Hong Kong Jockey Club.

In 2016, Tabcorp and Longitude Announce Strategic Technology Initiative.

In 2016, Longitude was acquired by Nasdaq to further explore a number of financial markets applications for the Enhanced Pari-Mutuel System.

Further reading

The Football Pools 
The Football Pools announces the launch of MatchXtra, an innovative new Pools product. - December 4, 2014

The Football Pools Launches MatchXtra. - December 8, 2014

Hong Kong Jockey Club 
The Hong Kong Jockey Club relaunches Quartet as the first product powered by Longitude. – January 1, 2014

Quartet betting to return for first time since 1988. – January 9, 2014

Longitude engine will take betting further, says Hong Kong Jockey Club. – May 7, 2014

Quartet and First 4 to merge into one pool for increased customer benefits. – January 12, 2015

New technology to merge Quartet, First Four pools. – January 13, 2015

Nothing really equates to the Longitude experience. – January 14, 2015

Combined Quartet, First Four pools sees turnover rise. – January 19, 2015

Composite Win to be launched from October 25th. – October 7, 2015

Optimism for bumper new racing season, says Jockey Club chief Winfried Engelbrecht-Bresges. – July 16, 2016

Putting on a show for the world as more punters want a piece of Hong Kong. – December 9, 2016

Betting on Britain: Jockey Club sees great growth with commingling expected to hit HK$12b a year. – July 18, 2017

Tabcorp 
New technology for tote punters. – February 3, 2016

Tabcorp to revamp pari-mutuel betting in key territories with Longitude. – February 3, 2016

Tabcorp in US deal to expand betting options. – February 4, 2016

Other 
Gaming Laboratories International validates Longitude Calculations. – November 3, 2011

Single pool wagering will change betting as we know it. – April 24, 2013

Lessons from single-pool wagering in Hong Kong show promise for US markets. – May 25, 2015

Sports Betting in America. – May 31, 2016

See also 
Parimutuel betting
Sports betting
Horse racing

References

*

Financial technology companies
Wagering
Gambling technology
Horse racing